Commodore Theatre is an historic movie theater located at Portsmouth, Virginia. It was built in 1945, and is an Art Deco style, 1,000-seat theater building. The two-story front facade features a plain mass of yellow pressed brick decorated with horizontal stripes of brown brick on the upper level with a central pavilion of curved-top vertical pylons of Indiana limestone and decorative strips of glass block.  The lower level of the facade is composed of Indiana limestone ashlar veneer with a base of black marble.  A dominant element of the auditorium is the pair of restored murals on the side walls representing the progress of America and the commerce and industry of Hampton Roads.

The theater currently offers first-run films on a nightly basis, featuring Dolby Digital and THX sound, accompanied by a full dining experience serviced by a full kitchen in the main building.

It was listed on the National Register of Historic Places in 1997.  It is located in the Downtown Portsmouth Historic District.

References

External links
Commodore Theatre website

Theatres on the National Register of Historic Places in Virginia
Art Deco architecture in Virginia
Theatres completed in 1945
Buildings and structures in Portsmouth, Virginia
National Register of Historic Places in Portsmouth, Virginia
Individually listed contributing properties to historic districts on the National Register in Virginia